Njårdhallen is an indoor sports arena located in Vestre Aker, Oslo, Norway. It was opened in 1960, and designed by Frode Rinnan. It is mainly used by the sports club Njård for indoor sports such as basketball and handball. Formerly, mainly in the 1960s and 1970s, it was used for large meetings and rock concerts. It has also been used as a professional boxing venue.

Notable concerts in Njårdhallen
1960 - March 1 – Jazz at the Philharmonic with Ella Fitzgerald
1960 - May – Peer Gynt with Riksteatret
1961 - February 17 – Louis Armstrong
1961 - August 23 – Cliff Richard
1963 - October 23 – John Coltrane quartet including McCoy Tyner, Elvin Jones og Jimmy Garrison
1964 - April 15 – Jim Reeves, Chet Atkins, Bobby Bare, Anita Kerr Singers.
1964 – The Everly Brothers.
1967 - January 25 – Duke Ellington
1967 - April 7 – Otis Redding, Sam & Dave, Arthur Conley, Eddie Floyd, The Mar-Keys, Booker T. & the M.G.'s.
1967 - May 2 – The Who.
1969 - March 18 - The Cannonball Adderley Quintet.
1969 - March 29 / November 3 – Fleetwood Mac.
1969 - June 14 – Blind Faith.
1970 - May 13 – Ella Fitzgerald, Count Basie
1970 - October 21 – Modern Jazz Quartet including Milt Jackson
1970 - October 22 – Charles Mingus sextet, Earl Hines
1970 - November 11 – Deep Purple,
1972 - January 11 – Jethro Tull
1971 - April 22 – Black Sabbath,.
1971 - April 26 – Deep Purple.
1972 - January 10 – Jethro Tull
1972 - August 9 – Wings/Paul McCartney,.
1974 - September 25 – Suzi Quatro.
1974 - October 6 – Sweet.
1974 - September 18 – Frank Zappa.
1974 - December 4 Focus
1975 - April 28 – Nazareth.
1976 - February 23 – Frank Zappa.
1976 - March 28 – 10cc.
1976 - December 3 – Nazareth.

References

Sports venues in Oslo
Buildings and structures in Oslo
Indoor arenas in Norway
Music venues in Oslo
Sports venues completed in 1960
1960 establishments in Norway
Boxing venues in Norway
Basketball venues in Norway
Handball venues in Norway